Jorge Mateo Cuesta Porte-Petit (b. Córdoba, Veracruz,  September 23, 1903 – d. Tlalpan, August 13, 1942) was a Mexican chemist, writer and editor.

Biography 
Cuesta attended school in his hometown, before he did his studies at the Faculty of Chemistry of Universidad Nacional Autónoma de México (UNAM) until 1925. In 1924 he published his first short story in a magazine. When he finished his studies, he moved back to Córdoba for a short time.

In 1927, back in Mexico City, he met his later wife Guadalupe Marín, who was married to Diego Rivera at that time. In 1928 he travelled to Europe, where he met Octavio G. Barreda, Carlos Luquín, André Breton, Carlos Pellicer, Samuel Ramos and Agustín Lazo. Back in Mexico, Marín and Cuesta married in November 9, 1928. He was co-founder of the Los Contemporáneos group. Cuesta, who worked for several magazines, founded his own magazine in 1932, named Examen. In 1930 his only son was born, Lucio Antonio Cuesta Marín. In 1933, he divorced from Marín.

Following a fit of madness that included an act of self-castration, Cuesta was hospitalized and would later hang himself using the bedsheets from the sanitarium where he was interred. He is buried in the Panteón Francés, Mexico City.

Selected works / publications 
 Canto a un Dios Mineral
 A Pesar del Oscuro Silencio
 La Calle del Amor
 Poeta, Funde tu Campana
 El plan contra Calles, 1934
 Poesía de Jorge Cuesta, 1942
 Crítica de la reforma del Artículo Tercero, (1943

References

External links 
 

Mexican chemists
20th-century Mexican writers
20th-century male writers
Writers from Veracruz
National Autonomous University of Mexico alumni
Suicides by hanging in Mexico
Artists who committed suicide
1903 births
1942 suicides
Print editors
People from Córdoba, Veracruz
Mexican literary critics
1942 deaths
Castrated people